Per-Gunnar "P-G" Andersson (born 10 March 1980 in Årjäng) is a Swedish rally driver. He is a two-time winner of the Junior World Rally Championship.

Career

Andersson was competing in Junior World Rally Championship since 2003. He became JWRC champion in 2004 during his first complete season. Piloting a Suzuki Ignis S1600, he earned three wins, a second place, an eight place, and two retirements. He scored 39 points during this year while runner-up Nicolas Bernardi, piloting Renault Clio S1600, scored only 2 fewer points.

In 2005 season, Andersson continued competing in the 
JWRC with Suzuki Ignis S1600 and later Suzuki Swift S1600. Although he won Rally Acropolis, the rest of season wasn't that successful and, in final standings, Andersson finished sixth with 30 points.

In 2006, Andersson was still racing in JWRC with a Suzuki Swift S1600. He won Rally Sweden but was excluded from Rally Turkey and crashed at Rally GB. He finished the season in third place with 29 points. Second place was Urmo Aava piloting a Suzuki Swift S1600 with 31 points, and Patrik Sandell became JWRC champion piloting a Renault Clio S1600 with 32 points.

In 2007 Andersson became Junior World Rally Champion for a second time with a Suzuki Swift S1600. Andersson won three rallies, scored one second place and one fourth place. Runner-up was Urmo Aava piloting a Suzuki Swift S1600 and third was Martin Prokop piloting a Citroen C2 S1600.

With two JWRC titles he was chosen by factory WRC team. Suzuki World Rally Team in the 2008 season. He started the season by finishing eighth at the 2008 Monte Carlo Rally in his first rally in a World Rally Car. He suffered from many mistakes and retirements during the season, finishing in the points only four times. His best result came in last two rallies of the season, fifth places at Rally Japan and Rally GB.

After the withdrawal of the Suzuki team at the end of 2008, Andersson was left without a regular drive for 2009. A drive in an ageing Škoda Fabia at Rally Norway saw two stage wins and a place in the top six on the first day before clutch problems forced him to retire. After that Andersson participated only at few local rallies and prepared for next season.

2010 Andersson was racing in SWRC with Škoda Fabia S2000, and won SWRC Rally Sweden. Although he was later removed from SWRC 2010 standings and only his victory in Sweden counted. He also raced a Ford Focus WRC in Rally Bulgaria for Stobart WRT and finished seventh..

In 2011, Andersson competed in two WRC events with a Ford Fiesta RS WRC, finishing seventh in Sweden and in Italy. He drove Tommi Mäkinen Racing's Subaru Impreza STi R4 on Rally Finland, finishing fifteenth.
He was also signed by Proton Motorsport to drive one of the Satria Neo S2000s in the Intercontinental Rally Challenge. The team's season was full of mechanical failures. The competitiveness of the car was also poor compared to that of rivals (i.e. Skoda Fabia S2000, Peugeot 207 S2000); he only scored points in the Barum Czech Rally Zlín, finishing ninth.

As for 2012, Proton decided to enter the S2000 World Rally Championship (SWRC), with Andersson as their number one driver. The season started off bittersweet, with Andersson leading almost till the end of the Monte Carlo Rallye, but was forced to retire due to fire. In Sweden, he bounced back, and won the SWRC category. He followed this up with a second place in New Zealand, and with a win in Finland. However, due to various problems and retirements in Wales and France, Craig Breen passed Andersson to claim the lead of the category, and with Andersson unable to win in Spain, he finished runner-up to the Irishman, although this was Proton's best result since winning the PWRC in 2002.

Racing record

Complete WRC results

JWRC results

SWRC results

† Andersson's entrant Rufa Sport failed to compete in the required number of events, meaning all of Andersson's points scored with the team have been annulled. His win in Sweden remains as he competed as a wildcard entrant and not with Rufa.

APRC results

Complete FIA European Rallycross Championship results

Supercar

Complete FIA World Rallycross Championship results

Supercar

References

External links

Official website
Andersson at ewrc-results.com

1980 births
Living people
World Rally Championship drivers
Swedish rally drivers
Intercontinental Rally Challenge drivers
European Rallycross Championship drivers
World Rallycross Championship drivers

M-Sport drivers